Palming is a technique for holding or concealing an object in the hand.  It is used frequently by magicians to conceal a card, coin, or other object. When it is done skillfully, the hand containing the palmed object is perceived to be completely empty.

Methods
A method for palming is known as a palm. These methods differ depending on the object intended to be concealed: its particular size, shape and flexibility. Any method of holding the object in the hand so that it cannot be directly seen by the spectators and such that the position of the hand does not arouse suspicion, i.e. the hand is perceived to be empty, can be used as a palm.

Uses
Palming an object generally allows for one of four effects to take place:
 Vanishing an object can be achieved by palming it. Used properly, the object will seem to have disappeared completely, and the performer's hands will appear to be empty.
 Producing an object can also be achieved by reversing the action of palming.
 Transposing two different objects can be achieved by simultaneous vanish and production. 
 Transforming similar to Transposing, to make an object appear to change into a different type or colour.

See also
 Miser's Dream
 Sleight of hand
 Tenkai palm

References
 Card Sleights
 Coin Sleights

External links

Magic tricks
Card magic
Coin magic
Sleight of hand